The Homburg Forest ( or just Homburg) also known as the Homburg Hills (Homburger Berge) is an area of upland up to   in the north German state of Lower Saxony.

Geography 
The Homburg Forest is located in the district of Holzminden on the eastern flanks of the central line of the Weser Uplands between the uplands and ridges of the Hils to the northeast, the Elfas to the east, the Holzberg to the south, the Amtsberge to the south-southeast, the Solling to the south, Burgberg to the southwest and the Vogler to the northwest. It lies between the towns of Eschershausen to the north and Stadtoldendorf to the south; a section of the B 64 federal highway from Eschershausen to Einbeck runs past it to the west, north and east.

Hills 
The hills of the Homburg Forest include (heights in metres above Normalnull; NN:

 unnamed hill (406.1 m)
 Großer Homburg (403 m; with the Homburg, incl. its castle tower)
 Till (399.2 m)
 Kohlenberg (396.7 m)
 Stadtberg (369.2 m)
 Wolfsberg (347.3 m)
 Kellberg (343.1 m; with the Kellberg Tower, an observation tower; 20 m high)
 Heidelberg (319.3 m)
 Schiffberg (311.0 m)

Rivers and streams 
The rivers and streams in and around the Homburg include: 
 Eber-/Forstbach (passes the Homburg Forest to the south; tributary of the Weser)
 Lenne (passes the forest to the north and northeast; tributary of the Weser)

Places of interest 
Amongst the places of interest, including natural and cultural monuments in the Homburg Forest are:

On the Großer Homburg (ca. ) stands the Homburg, a ruined castle from whose tower there is a good view of the area. Another good observation point is the [Kellburg Tower (Kellburgturm, 20 m high) on the Kellberg hill (343,1 m) to the east of Stadtoldendorf. Also worth seeing is the abbey of Amelungsborn, which is west of the Homburg on the southern edge of Das Odfeld. Natural monuments include the Seven Brothers' Beech (Sieben-Brüder-Buche) and the Tentrus Oak (Tentruseiche).

References 

Central Uplands
Hill ranges of Lower Saxony
Holzminden (district)